Zearing may refer to:

 Zearing, Illinois
 Zearing, Iowa